George Whitney may refer to:

George Whitney (rugby league) (fl. 1920s), Welsh rugby player
George H. Whitney (1863–1928), New York politician
George S. Whitney (1878–1956), American football coach
George F. Whitney (1873–1935), American tennis player

See also
George Whitney Calhoun (1890–1963), sports and telegraph editor; co-founder of the Green Bay Packers